The men's mass start race of the 2015–16 ISU Speed Skating World Cup 4, arranged in the Thialf arena in Heerenveen, Netherlands, was held on 13 December 2015.

Arjan Stroetinga of the Netherlands won the race, while Fabio Francolini of Italy came second, and Lee Seung-hoon of South Korea came third. Yan Fang of China won the Division B race.

Results

The race took place on Sunday, 13 December, with Division A scheduled at 17:27, and Division B scheduled at 18:05 (both in the afternoon session).

Division A

Division B

References

Men mass start
4